Lazarus McCarthy Chakwera (born 5 April 1955) is a Malawian theologian and politician who has served as President of Malawi since June 2020. He also serves as Minister of Defence per Malawian constitution, he has served as the leader of the Malawi Congress Party since 2013. He was President of the Malawi Assemblies of God from 1989 to 2013.

Previously, Chakwera was the Leader of the Opposition in the National Assembly following highly controversial elections held on 21 May 2019 which were overturned by the Constitutional Court. He was appointed chairman of SADC on 17 August at the SADC 41st Annual Summit held on 9 August to 19 August in Lilongwe, Malawi.

Personal life
Lazarus Chakwera was born in Lilongwe, the capital city of Malawi, on 5 April 1955 when the country was still under British colonial rule. His father was primary school teacher and supplemented family's income through subsistence farming. He married Monica Chakwera on October 8, 1977, and together, they have four children (one son and 3 daughters).

Education
Chakwera graduated with a Bachelor of Arts (Philosophy) Degree from the University of Malawi in 1977. He studied theology and gained an Honours degree from the University of the North in South Africa and gained a master's degree (MTh) from the University of South Africa in 1991. The Trinity International University in the United States awarded him a doctorate (D. Min) in 2000. He became a professor at the Pan-Africa Theological Seminary in 2005.

Theological career
He worked as an instructor at the Assemblies of God's School of Theology from 1983 to 2000 where he became the Principal in 1996. He has been the co-director and a lecturer at All Nations Theological Seminary. From 1989 to 2013 he presided over the Malawi Assemblies of God. On 14 April 2013 he took many by surprise when he declared his intentions to run at a convention of the opposition Malawi Congress Party (MCP) as president while still maintaining the Assemblies of God Presidency.

Political career
Rumours of Chakwera's intention to run in the MCP's presidential race were first reported in online media on 9 April 2013. They were confirmed on 14 April 2013. Chakwera later submitted his nomination papers while still at the helm of the Malawi Assemblies of God. The MCP convention slated for 27 April 2013 was later postponed to 10 and 11 August where he was elected as the president of MCP and he represented the party in the 2014 general election. During 2014 Malawi General elections, rumors speculated in different platforms that the elections were rigged. Chakwera told all Malawians to remain peaceful, accept the outcome, and wait for the next coming elections. Besides being successful as the main opposition party president, he also served as a member of parliament for the Lilongwe North West Constituency.

Chakwera announced his resignation as the Head of the Malawian Assemblies of God, effective 14 May 2013. He said this would enable him to concentrate more on front-line politics, taking the view that he was still serving God in another context. Chakwera joined forces with UTM leader Saulos Chilima and multiple other parties to form the 'Tonse Alliance' in preparation for the June 2020 Malawi General elections, with Chilima running as vice president. This happened when Court ruled out the 2019 General elections due to massive irregularities after DPP claimed victory.

Chakwera defeated incumbent president Peter Mutharika in the 2020 election, having obtained almost 59% of the vote. Chakwera was sworn in as the sixth president of Malawi on 28 June. On this occasion, Malawi became the first African Country to have its presidential election result overturned due to irregularities and an opposition leader went on to win the rerun election. The Republic of Kenya's Supreme Court had been the very first to nullify in 2017, but the rerun election therefrom was never was won by the opposition leader.

Presidency

Cabinet appointments

Soon after Chakwera's election as president, he became subject to criticism over appointing mutually related family members to cabinet. Chakwera's 31 member cabinet announced after inauguration had six members all of whom are relatives with another member of the cabinet. Mo Sidik Mia, Chakwera's running mate in 2019, was appointed Minister of Transport and Public Works and his wife Abida Mia the Deputy Minister for Lands. Kenny Kandodo and his sister Khumbize Kandodo both occupied ministerial posts, the former being the Minister for Labour while the latter being the Minister for Health. Similarly, Gospel Kazako became Minister of Information while his sister-in-law Nkhuso Nkhuma became the Deputy Minister for Agriculture. More than 70% of the cabinet ministers were from the central region of Malawi, Chakwera's traditional stronghold. Chakwera defended his decisions, saying that he will address concerns related to the appointments.

Activists and organisations working on gender equality organised public demonstrations in October 2020 protesting against gender imbalance in public service appointments that Chakwera had made. The activists accused President Chakwera of disregarding the Malawi Gender Equality Act that demands that women should make at least 40 per cent of all public appointments. The activists sued the President over the gender imbalance in his appointments. The issue is still in Court.

Trimming executive powers

Chakwera has said that he was working to trim executive powers to make Presidents more accountable to people and increase powers of other branches of the government.

Chairperson of SADC

Lazarus Chakwera was elected by member states of SADC as the Chairperson of the group. He is currently the chairman of the SADC which he assumed from his predecessor, Mozambican President Filipe Nyusi in August 2021.

Daughter's appointments
Chakwera has faced criticism for appointing his daughter and vice president Saulos Chilima's mother-in-law to diplomatic positions. The president appointed his daughter Violet Chakwera as a diplomatic secretary to Brussels and for the EU. However, the president vehemently refuted these reports as baseless and stated so on a BBC interview during his visit to the UK in 2021. Published media reports indicate that his daughter is not qualified for the job, having obtained her degree from an unaccredited institution.

Foreign policy

President Chakwera has formed a strong and positive relationship with British Prime Minister Boris Johnson, describing their partnership as "crucial."  Prime Minister Boris Johnson expressed hope for a long-term UK-Malawi partnership that focused on promoting green technologies in Malawi, and Malawi's Government Spokesperson and Minister of Information, Gospel Kazako said that Prime Minister Johnson and President Chakwera would discuss "various development, trade and investment deals, which so far has been a great success and Malawi stands to benefit more and better."  After the 2021 Zambian general election in which Edgar Lungu lost to Hakainde Hichilema and then gracefully accepted the results of the election, President Chakwea said: "The pattern of peaceful transitions of power we have been seeing in our region in recent years, ... (with) Zambia being the latest member to embody that, are worthy of global acclaim and our applause."

Second term
In interview with Zodiak Broadcasting Station, a local radio station, Chakwera remarked that it will be up to the people to re-elect him in 2025 when Malawi holds the next presidential elections. Similarly, other senior members of his Malawi Congress Party have indicated that Chakwera will stand in 2025 because he is allowed to do so by his party's constitution.

This has the potential to cause a rift between Chakwera and vice president Chilima. It is understood that the two had agreed to rotate the presidency between them prior to formation of their electoral alliance. During a political rally in the country's commercial city of Blantyre leading up to the presidential race in 2020, Chilima revealed that one of the basis for the formation of the Tonse Alliance between Malawi Congress Party and UTM was that after the first term of his presidency, Chakwera would pave way for Chilima to lead the pact in the 2025 presidential elections. Chakwera has not directly declared his interest to stand for a second term.

References

1955 births
Living people
People from Lilongwe
Malawian Protestants
Presidents of Malawi
Defence ministers of Malawi
Malawi Congress Party politicians
University of Malawi alumni
University of Limpopo alumni
University of South Africa alumni
Trinity International University alumni
Assemblies of God people
Malawian theologians